HMAT Warilda (His Majesty's Australian Transport) was a 7713-ton vessel, built by William Beardmore and Company in Glasgow as the SS Warilda for the Adelaide Steamship Company. She was designed for the East-West Australian coastal service, but following the start of the First World War, she was converted into a troopship and later, in 1916, she was converted into a hospital ship.

Her identical sister ships, also built by William Beardmore and Company, were SS Wandilla (1912) and SS Willochra (1913).

Time as a troopship 

 5 October 1915: 10th Reinforcements, 9th Battalion embarked from Brisbane heading to Egypt.: 15 Batt embarked Brisbane HMAT A69 Warilda same date
 8 October 1915: 10th Reinforcements, 1st Infantry Battalion embarked from Sydney heading to Egypt.
 8 October 1915: 10th Reinforcements, 1st Brigade of the AIF, embarked from Liverpool, NSW, Australia. The ship arrived at Fremantle, Western Australia on 15 October 1915, and reached Suez on 5 November, when the troops were disembarked.
 25 May 1916: Tunneling Companies, 2 Reinforcements embarked Melbourne.
 1 June 1916: Tunneling Company 6, 3rd Tunneling Company embarked from Fremantle, Western Australia 1 June 1916. Disembarked Plymouth, England, 18 July 1916.

Sinking 

On 3 August 1918, she was transporting wounded soldiers from Le Havre, France to Southampton when she was torpedoed by the German submarine UC-49. This was despite being marked clearly with the Red Cross; as with a number of other hospital ships torpedoed during the war, Germany claimed the ships were also carrying arms.

The ship sank in about two hours, and of the 801 persons on board, 123 died when the Warilda sank. The Deputy Chief Controller of the Queen Mary's Army Auxiliary Corp, Mrs Violet Long, lost her life in this action. Amongst the survivors was her commander, Captain Sim, who was later awarded the OBE by King George V. Her wreck lies in the English Channel

Images

References

External links 

 Australian Light Horse Studies Centre His Majesty's Australian Transports HMAT Ships, Transporting the 1st AIF.
 WARILDA picture by Green, Allan C.
 Photo at Picture Australia

World War I auxiliary ships of Australia
World War I shipwrecks in the English Channel
Maritime incidents in 1918
Ships sunk by German submarines in World War I
Hospital ships in World War I
Ships built on the River Clyde
1911 ships
Hospital ships of the United Kingdom
Iron and steel steamships of Australia
Adelaide Steamship Company